Makhdoom Hashim Jawan Bakht is a Pakistani politician who was the Provincial Minister of Punjab for Finance, in office from 27 August 2018 till April 2022. He had been a member of the Provincial Assembly of the Punjab from August 2018 till January 2023. Previously, he was a Member of the Provincial Assembly of the Punjab from May 2013 to May 2018.

Early life and education
Bakht was born on 27 September 1979.

He has a Bachelor of Commerce degree from McGill University.

He studied in Aitchison College Lahore for schooling.

Political career

Bakht was elected to the Provincial Assembly of the Punjab as an independent candidate from Constituency PP-291 (Rahimyar Khan-VII) in 2013 Pakistani general election. He joined Pakistan Muslim League (N) (PML-N) in May 2013.

He resigned from the Punjab Assembly in May 2018. In April 2018, he quit PML-N.

Bakht was re-elected to the Provincial Assembly of the Punjab as a candidate of Pakistan Tehreek-e-Insaf (PTI) from Constituency PP-259 (Rahim Yar Khan-V) and from PP-261 (Rahim Yar Khan-VII) in 2018 Pakistani general election. 

On 27 August 2018, Bakht was inducted into the provincial Punjab cabinet of Chief Minister Sardar Usman Buzdar and was appointed as Provincial Minister of Punjab for Finance.

References

Living people
1979 births
Punjab MPAs 2013–2018
Punjab MPAs 2018–2023
Pakistan Muslim League (N) MPAs (Punjab)
Pakistan Tehreek-e-Insaf MPAs (Punjab)
McGill University Faculty of Management alumni
Finance Ministers of Punjab, Pakistan